Mustafa Ahmed Saeed Alfadni (born 24 October 1999) is a Sudanese footballer who plays as a right midfielder for Al Ahli Khartoum and the Sudan national team. He played twice for the Sudan under-20 team at the 2017 Africa U-20 Cup of Nations, and was named in the Sudan squad for the 2021 Africa Cup of Nations.

Honours
Al-Hilal Club
Sudan Premier League: 2016, 2017
Sudan Cup: 2016
Source:

References

External links

1999 births
Living people
Sudanese footballers
Association football midfielders
Sudan international footballers
Sudan under-20 international footballers
2021 Africa Cup of Nations players
Al-Hilal Club (Omdurman) players
Al Ahli SC (Khartoum) players
Al-Ahly Shendi players